Tonya is an English female given name. The name originated as a short form of Antonia with influence from the Spanish form Toña. It can be found throughout the English-speaking world but is most common in the United States. The popularity of the name has been influenced by its conflation with the unrelated name Tanya, which originated as a diminutive form of Tatiana.

Other spellings with similar derivations include Tonja and Tonia. The variant form LaTonya is particularly associated with African-American women.

People called Tonya

Entertainment
 Tonya Cooley (born 1980), American model
 Tonya Crews (born 1938), American model
 Tonya Crowe (born 1971), American actress
 Tonya Kay, American actress and dancer
 Tonya Pinkins, American actress
 Tonya Williams (born 1958), Canadian actress

Sports
 Tonya Edwards (born 1968), American basketball coach
 Tonya Harding (born 1970), American ice skater
 Tonya Verbeek (born 1977), Canadian wrestler
 Tonya Washington (born 1977), American basketball player

Other fields
 Tonya Hurley, American writer and director
 Tonya Knight (born 1966), American bodybuilder
 Tonya Schuitmaker (born 1968), American politician

References

See also

Tona (name)
 Tanya (name)
 Tania (name)
 Tanja (name)
Tonda (name)
Tonja (name)
 Tonje (name)
 Tonia (name)
Tonka (name)
Tonye

English feminine given names